Bonnie View is a privately owned unincorporated community in Colusa County, California, United States. Bonnie View was settled by John and Mary Caldwell about 1875 under the Homestead Act of 1862. The Caldwell family lived on the land for many years prior to receiving their official land grant in 1896.

Originally , Bonnie View is now  surrounded to the north, west and south by the Mendocino National Forest. The property is owned by five families, each with an undivided 1/5 interest. The name "Bonnie View" presumably derives from the view east which includes the community of Stonyford, East Park Reservoir, the Sutter Buttes, and the Sierra Nevada.

References

Unincorporated communities in California
Unincorporated communities in Colusa County, California
1875 establishments in California